Poya is the name given to the Lunar monthly Buddhist holiday of Uposatha in Sri Lanka, where it is a civil and bank holiday.
Full moon day is normally considered as the poya day in every month.

Poya
A Poya occurs every full moon. Uposatha is important to Buddhists all around the world, who have adopted the lunar calendar for their religious observances. Owing to the moon's fullness of size as well as its effulgence, the full moon day is treated as the most auspicious of the four lunar phases occurring once every lunar month (29.5 days) and thus marked by a holiday.

Every full moon day is known as a Poya in the Sinhala language; this is when a practicing Sri Lankan Buddhist visits a temple for religious observances. There are 13 or 14 Poyas per year. The term poya is derived from the Pali and Sanskrit word uposatha (from upa + vas "to fast"), primarily signifying "fast day". Generally shops and businesses are closed on Poya days, and the sale of alcohol and meat is forbidden.

The Poya Day in each month generally falls on the Gregorian date of the full moon but occasionally it falls a day on either side. The designated Poya Day is based on the phase of the moon at the Madhyahana time of day (the variant of Madhyahana which only covers two ghatikas).

If a month has two Poya days, the name of the second one will be preceded by "Adhi" ("extra" in Sinhala) as in "Adhi Vesak", "Adhi Poson", etc.

See also 
List of Buddhist festivals
Mid-Autumn Festival, similar Chinese/Vietnamese Buddhist festival occurring on the day of the full moon. 
Tshechu, similar concept in Bhutan however revolves around the tenth day of a lunar month.

Notes 

Buddhist holidays
Observances held on the full moon
Lunar observation
January observances
February observances
March observances
April observances
May observances
September observances
October observances
November observances
December observances 
Observances on non-Gregorian calendars
Public holidays in Sri Lanka